Mohamed Abdel-Kader Coubadja-Touré (born 8 April 1979) is a Togolese former professional footballer who played as a forward.

Club career
After starting out with Étoile Filante de Lomé, he left Togo for  CA Bizertin (Tunisia) before landing at AC Parma in Italy in 1998, from where he had loan spells at clubs in Switzerland, Egypt and Italy. In 2003–04 he scored 19 goals in 35 matches for Swiss outfit Servette FC and was elected best Togolese player abroad. Kader also played  for En Avant Guingamp in France, but left the club in the summer of 2008.

International career
Kader's star rose in his home country after he scored the late winner in the 1998 African Cup of Nations match against Ghana, thus securing the Togo national team's first ever win at the tournament. The forward later played in the 2000 and 2002 editions, as well as featuring in Togo's disappointing campaign in Egypt in 2006.

He helped Togo reach the 2006 World Cup, their first World Cup ever. He further scored the team's first and only World Cup goal in a loss to South Korea.

References

External links
 
 

1979 births
Living people
People from Sokodé
Association football forwards
Togolese footballers
Togo international footballers
Togolese Muslims
2006 FIFA World Cup players
1998 African Cup of Nations players
2000 African Cup of Nations players
2002 African Cup of Nations players
2006 Africa Cup of Nations players
CA Bizertin players
Parma Calcio 1913 players
FC Lugano players
Al Ahli Club (Dubai) players
L.R. Vicenza players
Servette FC players
FC Sochaux-Montbéliard players
En Avant Guingamp players
Al Jazira Club players
Al Dhafra FC players
Ajman Club players
Étoile Filante du Togo players
Ligue 1 players
Ligue 2 players
Serie B players
Swiss Super League players
UAE Pro League players
Togolese expatriate footballers
Togolese expatriate sportspeople in Tunisia
Expatriate footballers in Tunisia
Togolese expatriate sportspeople in Italy
Expatriate footballers in Italy
Togolese expatriate sportspeople in Switzerland
Expatriate footballers in Switzerland
Expatriate footballers in the United Arab Emirates
21st-century Togolese people